WUWA (Workplace and House Exhibition) was a building exhibition held in Breslau, Weimar Republic (today Wroclaw, Poland) in 1929.
Organized by the Silesian committee of the Deutsche Werkbund, close to the Scheitniger Park (currently Tramwajowa, Dembowskiego, Mikolaja Kopernika and Zielonego Dębu streets). Several local architects, mainly members of Werkbund, participated in the exhibition. 32 different types of buildings were presented to serve as "standards". The main focus was on simple, but not trivial architectonical form and functionality. All 32 buildings were built within a three-month period. Recreational areas were a part of this project, together with a wooden kindergarten which was supposed to show new architectural trends.

One of the most interesting buildings of the complex is Hans Scharoun's house for singles and young couples, which now serves as a hotel. The entire area received the European Heritage Label from the European Commission.

Architects

Locations

Bibliography

 Rudolf von Delius: Werkbund-Versuchssiedlung in Breslau. In: Dekorative Kunst, illustrierte Zeitschrift für angewandte Kunst, Bd. 37 = Jg. 32, 1928/29, S. 273–281(Digitalisat).
Edith Rischowski: Das Wohnhaus als Einheit. Häuser und Räume der Versuchssiedlung Breslau. In: Innen-Dekoration, Jg. 40, 1929, S. 400–432 (Digitalisat).
Wohnung und Werkraum. Werkbund Ausstellung Breslau 1929. In: Der Baumeister, Jg. 27, 1929, S. 285–307, Tafel 85/86–100.
Georg Münter: Wohnung und Werkraum. Ein Versuch die Werkbund-Ausstellung in Breslau 1929 zu würdigen. In: Wasmuths Monatshefte für Baukunst, Jg. 13, 1929, S. 441–453 (Digitalisat).
Kaiser: Die Werkbund-Ausstellung: "Wohnung und Werkraum" Breslau 1929. In: Die Bauzeitung. Vereinigt mit "Süddeutsche Bauzeitung" München, Jg. 26, Heft 39, 28. September 1929, S. 415–421 und Heft 40, 5. Oktober 1929, S. 423–429.
Alena Janatková, Hanna Kozinska-Witt (Hrsg.): Wohnen in der Großstadt 1900–1939. Franz Steiner Verlag, Stuttgart 2006, .
 Judith Lembke: Die neue Welt von gestern, in: Frankfurter Allgemeine Zeitung vom 30. Nov. 2016
 Bundesinstitut für Ostdeutsche Kultur und Geschichte (Hrsg.): Jahrbuch des Bundesinstituts für Ostdeutsche Kultur und Geschichte. Band 3, Oldenbourg Wissenschaftsverlag, München 1995, .
 Institut für Auslandsbeziehungen (Hrsg.): Auf dem Weg zum Neuen Wohnen – Die Werkbundsiedlung Breslau 1929. Birkhäuser Verlag, Berlin 1996, 
 Deutscher Werkbund Hessen, Arbeitsgruppe »WUWA Breslau« Hg.: Helmut Hofmann. Architekt und Künstler, Student an der Kunstakademie Breslau 1928/1929. Ausstellungskatalog der Ausst. in Wrocław 1999. Frankfurt 1999, S. 16 ff. (ohne ISBN, zweisprachig deutsch-polnisch)
Jadwiga Urbanik / Grażyna Hryncewicz-Lamber: WuWA – Wohnung und Werkraum. Werkbundausstellung in Breslau 1929, 2. Aufl., Wrocław 2015,  (online).

External links 
 
 

Buildings and structures in Wrocław
Modernist architecture in Poland
Exhibitions in Germany
1929 in Germany
1920s architecture
Planned communities in Poland
Tourist attractions in Wrocław